NA-30 Peshawar-III is a constituency for the National Assembly of Pakistan.

Area
During the delimitation of 2018, NA-29 (Peshawar-III) acquired areas from three former constituencies namely NA-2 (Peshawar-II), NA-3 (Peshawar-III), and NA-4 (Peshawar-IV), the areas of Peshawar which are part of this constituency are listed below alongside the former constituency name from which they were acquired:

Areas acquired from NA-2 Peshawar-II
Qasba (excluding Palusi Attuzai, Palusi Maqadarzai, Palusi Talarzai, Jaba Jungle (Tukra No. 1), and Mahal Salu)

Areas acquired from NA-3 Peshawar-III
Jaba Jungle (Tukra No. 1)

Areas acquired from NA-4 Peshawar-IV
Badaber (excluding Sori Zai Payan, Musa Zai and Deh Bahadur)

Members of Parliament

2018-2022: NA-29 Peshawar-III

2018 Election 

General elections were held on 25 July 2018.

See also
NA-29 Peshawar-II
NA-31 Peshawar-IV

References

External links 
 Election result's official website

29
29